Jennifer Glasse is an American broadcast journalist, currently working for NPR and the CBC. Glasse had been with Al Jazeera English since 2011, and is now a correspondent in Kabul in Afghanistan. In 1997, she won an Overseas Press Club award for her work in Zaire and in 2003 she received a Gracie Allen award.

References

External links
 Official website

1968 births
Living people
American television reporters and correspondents
American expatriates in Afghanistan
American expatriates in Russia
American expatriates in the United Kingdom
American women television journalists
21st-century American women